Probable G-protein coupled receptor 87 is a protein that in humans is encoded by the GPR87 gene.

G protein-coupled receptors play a role in cell communication. They are characterized by an extracellular N terminus, 7 transmembrane regions, and an intracellular C terminus.[supplied by OMIM]

References

Further reading

G protein-coupled receptors